Kate Martin is an Australian singer-songwriter originally from Townsville, Queensland.

Discography 
 Hand Me My Bow And Arrow (2012)
 Synthetic Shoes, Leather Boots (2010)

References 

Living people
Year of birth missing (living people)
Australian women singer-songwriters
People from Townsville